Forgotten Prophet: The Life of Randolph Bourne is a book-length biography of American writer Randolph Bourne written by Bruce Clayton and published by Louisiana State University Press.

References 

 
 
 
 
 
 
 
 

1984 non-fiction books
American biographies
Louisiana State University Press books
Biographies about writers
English-language books